A Brooklyn State of Mind is a 1997 American crime drama film written and directed by Frank Rainone.

Cast 

 Vincent Spano: Al Stanco 
 Maria Grazia Cucinotta: Gabriela 
 Danny Aiello: Danny Parente 
 Abe Vigoda: Uncle Guy 
 Rick Aiello: Nicky Vetrino
 Leonard Spinelli: Young Nicky Vetrino
 Tony Danza: Louie Crisci  
 Jennifer Esposito: Donna Delgrosso 
 Morgana King: Aunt Rose 
 Vincent Pastore: Vinnie "D" 
 Jamie-Lynn Sigler: Young Angie
 Arthur Nascarella: Building Inspector

References

External links

1997 films
1997 crime drama films
American crime drama films
Films set in Brooklyn
Films shot in New York City
1990s American films